Luke Duzel (born 5 February 2002), is an Australian professional footballer who plays as a midfielder for Adelaide United.

Club career

Western United
On 24 September 2019, Duzel signed his first professional contract with Western United, penning a scholarship deal for the 2019–20 season. He made his professional debut in a Round 21 clash against Central Coast Mariners, replacing Jerry Skotadis in the 90th minute in a 6–2 win.

In February 2023, Duzel had his contract mutually terminated by Western United.

Adelaide United
On 8 February 2023, Adelaide United announced they had signed Duzel for the remainder of the 2022–23 A-League Men season.

International career
On 2 October 2019, Duzel was selected in the Joeys squad for the 2019 FIFA U-17 World Cup. He made two substitute appearances in the Joeys' Group B fixtures, appearing in a 2–2 draw against Hungary and a 2–1 win over Nigeria as they progressed to the Knockout stage. He was a 67th minute substitute in their Round of 16 clash with France on 7 November 2019, losing 4-0 and being eliminated from the competition.

Personal life
Duzel is of Croatian through his father, Ivan Duzel, who was a footballer who emigrated to Australia at the age of 22.

Honours

International
Australia U17
AFF U-16 Youth Championship third place: 2017

References

External links

2002 births
Living people
Australian soccer players
Australian people of Croatian descent
Association football midfielders
Melbourne Knights FC players
Melbourne City FC players
Western United FC players
National Premier Leagues players
A-League Men players
Soccer players from Melbourne
Australia youth international soccer players